Henry Roberto Viáfara Possú  (born 20 April 1953 in Puerto Tejada) is a retired Colombian footballer.

Career
Viáfara played for Deportivo Pereira and América de Cali during his professional career. Viáfara made several appearances for the senior Colombia national football team, including participating at the 1983 Copa América.

He also played for Colombia at the 1980 Olympic Games in Moscow.

References

1953 births
Living people
Colombian footballers
Colombia international footballers
Footballers at the 1980 Summer Olympics
Olympic footballers of Colombia
1983 Copa América players
Deportivo Pereira footballers
América de Cali footballers
Association football defenders
Sportspeople from Cauca Department